Erskine Station is an unincorporated community in Center Township, Vanderburgh County, in the U.S. state of Indiana.

It is located outside the city limits of Evansville to the north.

Geography

References

Unincorporated communities in Vanderburgh County, Indiana
Unincorporated communities in Indiana